City Road is a disused London Underground station in Islington, central London. It was opened in 1901 as part of the City & South London Railway's extension from Moorgate Street to Angel. City Road was situated between Old Street and Angel. The railway is now part of the Northern line.

The station was closed in 1922 due to low passenger usage. The underground tunnels remain at track level, but the station remained derelict until the 1960s, when it was demolished except for the structure around the original lift shaft. This remained at City Road's junction with Central Street and Moreland Street until the late 2010s, when it was replaced by the Bunhill 2 Energy Centre.

History

From the start, City Road station was little used, and discussions of its closure were held as early as 1908: less than seven years after it was opened. The station was close to both Old Street and Angel, and was in a deprived area of Islington.

Low passenger usage meant that the required expansion of the platform tunnels and upgrading of the station could not be justified on financial grounds, and City Road remained closed when the line was reopened on 20 April 1924. The platforms were removed and the lift shaft was converted for use as a ventilation shaft. City Road was the only twin tunnel station on the line not to be reconstructed. During the Second World War the station was converted for use as an air-raid shelter.

The station building remained until the 1960s, when all but the structure immediately around the original lift shaft was demolished. At track level the temporary structures for the air-raid shelter were removed after the war and the site of the platforms can be seen from passing trains.

Planning permission was granted in 2015 to demolish the remaining station structure for phase 2 of Islington Borough Council's scheme to heat the nearby King Square council estate. The Bunhill 2 Energy Centre opened on the site in 2020, capturing waste heat from the Northern Line tunnels to provide heat to additional residential buildings and a school.

Accidents

On 26 August 1916 a passenger was killed when a guard signalled for a train to depart before all of the passengers had alighted.

References

External links
London's Abandoned Tube Stations - City Road Includes underground photos.
 City Road station in 1915.

Former buildings and structures in the London Borough of Islington
Disused London Underground stations
Disused railway stations in the London Borough of Islington
Tube stations in the London Borough of Islington
Former City and South London Railway stations
Railway stations in Great Britain opened in 1901
Railway stations in Great Britain closed in 1922
Railway stations located underground in the United Kingdom